Pierre Joseph Roussier (1716 - Aug 18, 1792) was a French musicologist and theorist known as the proponent of Rameau's theories.

Works

Written Works 
 Mémoire sur la musique des anciens
 Observations sur différents points d’harmonie (1765)
 Traité des accords et de leur succession selon le système de la basse fondamentale (1764)
 Mémoire sur la musique des anciens (1770)
 L’Harmonie pratique (1775)
 Notes et observations sur le mémoire du P. Amiot concernant la musique des chinois (1779)
 Mémoire sur la nouvelle harpe de M. Cousineau (1782)
 Mémoire sur le clavecin chromatique (1782)
 Lettre sur l’acceptation des mots “basse fondamentale” (1783)

Citations 

 The Theoretical Writings of Abbé Pierre-Joseph Roussier, Richard Dale Osborne · 1966

References

External links 
 Pierre-Joseph Roussier at WorldCat
 Pierre-Joseph Roussier at Oxford Music Online
 Pierre-Joseph Roussier at Libraries Australia
 Pierre-Joseph Roussier at encyclopedia.com

French musicologists
1716 births
1792 deaths